Ouled Djellal is a town and commune in Ouled Djellal Province, Algeria. Prior to the creation of Ouled Djellal Province in 2019, Ouled Djellal was part of Biskra Province. According to the 1998 census it has a population of 45,622. more recent census says it has over 66,000 people. Mayor Rachid Boufateh (in 2016) announced that Ouled Djellal is to be a State in the next Administrative Division.

History 
Ouled Djellal was attached to the state of Biskra since the Ottoman Empire.

It is also the birthplace of Boughera El Ouafi, the 1928 Olympic marathon champion.

References

Ouled Djellal Province
Cities in Algeria
Algeria